is a Japanese judoka.

He won the Olympic gold medal in the heavyweight (+100 kg) division in 2004. He is also a two-time world champion.

He is noted for being a remarkably small judoka in the heavyweight division; he also regularly competed in the light-heavyweight (-100 kg) class.

Suzuki is known as having some of the best ashi waza of all heavyweights.

Suzuki was eliminated in the first round of the 2010 world Judo championship in Yoyogi, Japan, via ippon by Janusz Wojnarowicz of Poland.

Suzuki dislocated his shoulder in the semi-finals of the 2012 All-Japan Judo Championships and subsequently announced his retirement as he was not selected to represent Japan at the London 2012 Olympic Games.

Suzuki was appointed Men's Heavyweight Coach for the Japanese team by the new head coach, his friend and former rival Kosei Inoue.

References

External links
 
 
 
 
 
 Competition videos of Keiji Suzuki at Judovision

1980 births
Living people
Japanese male judoka
Judoka at the 2004 Summer Olympics
Judoka at the 2008 Summer Olympics
Olympic judoka of Japan
Olympic gold medalists for Japan
Olympic medalists in judo
Asian Games medalists in judo
World judo champions
Judoka at the 2002 Asian Games
Medalists at the 2004 Summer Olympics
Asian Games gold medalists for Japan
Recipients of the Medal with Purple Ribbon
Medalists at the 2002 Asian Games
Universiade medalists in judo
Universiade gold medalists for Japan
Sportspeople from Ibaraki Prefecture